Domergue Sumien (in Occitan Domergue Sumien, in French Dominique Sumien; born July 5, 1968, in Compiègne, France) is an Occitan linguist and writer. He is also a member of the Council of the Occitan Language, of the International Association for Occitan Studies (AIEO), of the Institute of Aranese Studies-Aranese Academy of the Occitan Language and a member of the Council of the Permanent Congress of the Occitan language.

Selected works
 2012,“Occitan : harmonizing non-dominant standards throughout four states”, in: Rudolf MUHR  (ed.) (2012) : Non-dominant varieties of pluricentric languages. Getting the picture (in memory of Michael Clyne), coll. Österreichisches Deutsch Sprache der Gegenwart 14, Frankfurt/Berlin/Bruxelles/New York/Oxford/Wien: Peter Lang, pp. 263–282
 2011,collaborador a l'edicion d'Angelica RIEGER (ed.) (2001) L’Occitanie invitée de l’Euregio. Liège 1981 - Aix-la-Chapelle 2008 : Bilan et perspectives — Actes du Neuvième Congrès de l’Association Internationale d’Études Occitanes
 2009, “Classificacion dei dialèctes occitans”, Lingüistica occitana 7 
 2009, “Comment rendre l’occitan disponible? Pédagogie et diglossie dans les écoles Calandretas”, in: SAUZET Patrick, & PIC François (dir.) (2009), Politique linguistique et enseignement des “langues de France”, Paris: L’Harmattan,  pp. 67-86
 2009, “L’estandardizacion deu gascon: l’ensenhament, la koinè e lo diasistèma”, in: LATRY Guy (2009) (ed.) La Voix occitane, actes du VIIIe Congrès de l’Association internationale d’études occitanes, Bordeaux, 2005, Pessac : Presses universitaires de Bordeaux, t. II / pp. 837-850
 2007, “Lo ròtle de la lexicografia dins la planificacion lingüistica”, Linguistica Occitana 5
 2007, “Besonhs e amiras de la sociolingüistica aplicada en Occitània”, in Anàlisi del discurs sociolingüístic català i occità, amb motiu del 60è anniversari de Georg Kremnitz, Wien: Praesens Verlag, pp. 181-200
 2007: Preconizacions del Conselh de la Lenga Occitana, Lingüistica Occitana 6  
 2006 La standardisation pluricentrique de l’occitan. Nouvel enjeu sociolinguistique, développement du lexique et de la morphologie, coll. Publications de l’Association Internationale d’Études Occitanes, Turnhout: Brepols
 2006, en collaboration avec Santiago MARTÍNEZ ARRIETA: “Els lligams entre català i occità: alguns problemes de representació, descripció i estandardització”, in: Miscel·lània Joan Veny, vol. 8, Montserrat: Publicacions de l’Abadia de Montserrat
 2005, “La terminologia informatica en occitan: la revirada dels logicials OpenOffice e Spip”, Linguistica Occitana 3
 2003, “L’occitan, lenga fantasmada: l’exemple de la toponimia”, in: LIEUTARD Hervé, & VERNY Marie-Jeanne, (2003) (ed.) Nouvelle recherche en domaine occitan: actes du colloque Jeunes chercheurs ReDòc (UMR 5475), avril 2002, coll. Lo Gat Negre, Montpellier: ReDòc-CEO-Université Paul Valéry, pp. 129-147.
 2000, “La question de la h dens los noms pròpris estrangèrs”, Reclams'' 777: pp. 15–16.

References

External links
 Domergue Sumien in Google Scholars
 Domergue Sumien's weekly papers in Jornalet
 Occitan Language Council / Conselh de la Lenga Occitana

Occitan-language writers
Linguists
1968 births
Living people